Barbodes banksi is a species of cyprinid fish native to Malaysia and Indonesia where it can be found in foothill and lowland streams with clear water.

References 

Barbodes
Fish described in 1940